Phoxocephalopsidae is a family of crustaceans belonging to the order Amphipoda.

Genera:
 Eophoxocephalopsis Thurston, 1989
 Phoxocephalopsis Schellenberg, 1931
 Pseudurothoe Ledoyer, 1986
 Puelche Barnard & Clark, 1982
 Urothopsis Ledoyer, 1967

References

Amphipoda